Qahjavarestan (also Romanized as Qahjāvarestān and Qahjāverestān; also known as Qahjāvarestāq and Qahjāwaristān) is a city in Qahab-e Shomali Rural District, in the Central District of Isfahan County, Isfahan Province, Iran. At the 2006 census, its population was 6,854, in 1,788 families.

References 

Populated places in Isfahan County
Cities in Isfahan Province